Uroš Đuranović (born 1 February 1994) is a Montenegrin professional footballer who plays as a forward for Serbian club Kolubara.

International career
Đuranović made his debut for the Montenegro national football team on 24 March 2022 in a friendly against Armenia.

Honours

Club
FK Iskra Danilovgrad
2. CFL: 2014–15

References

External links

 

1994 births
People from Budva
Living people
Association football forwards
Montenegrin footballers
Montenegro youth international footballers
Montenegro under-21 international footballers
Montenegro international footballers
FK Mogren players
FK Iskra Danilovgrad players
FK Dečić players
FK Dukla Prague players
Korona Kielce players
FK Radnički Niš players
FC Politehnica Iași (2010) players
FK Kolubara players
Kecskeméti TE players
Montenegrin First League players
Czech First League players
Ekstraklasa players
Serbian SuperLiga players
Liga I players
Nemzeti Bajnokság I players
Montenegrin expatriate footballers
Expatriate footballers in the Czech Republic
Montenegrin expatriate sportspeople in the Czech Republic
Expatriate footballers in Poland
Montenegrin expatriate sportspeople in Poland
Expatriate footballers in Serbia
Montenegrin expatriate sportspeople in Serbia
Expatriate footballers in Romania
Montenegrin expatriate sportspeople in Romania
Expatriate footballers in Hungary
Montenegrin expatriate sportspeople in Hungary